One Hundred Famous Views of Edo (in ) is a series of 119 ukiyo-e prints begun and largely completed by the Japanese artist Hiroshige (1797–1858). The prints were first published in serialized form in 1856–59, with Hiroshige II completing the series after Hiroshige's death. It was tremendously popular and much reprinted.

History

Hiroshige produced designs in the style of the Utagawa school, a 19th-century popular style in woodblock prints, much favoured during his lifetime. Increasingly large series of prints were produced. This trend can be seen in Hiroshige’s work, such as The Fifty-three Stations of the Tōkaidō and The Sixty-nine Stations of the Kisokaidō.

Many publishing houses arose and grew, publishing both books and individual prints. A publisher's ownership of the physical woodblocks used to print a given text or image constituted the closest equivalent to a concept of "copyright" that existed at this time.

Woodblock prints such as these were produced in large numbers in 18th- and 19th-century Japan, created by artists, block cutters and printers working independently to the instructions of specialist publishers. Prints such as these were called ukiyo-e, which means 'pictures of the floating world'. This world was one of transient delights and changing fashions centred on the licensed pleasure districts and popular theatres found in the major cities of Japan.

In the years 1829–36, a seven volume illustrated guidebook Pictures of famous places of  Edo (Edo meishō zue) was published. It was begun by Saitō Yukio (1737–1799) in 1790 and illustrated very accurately by Hasegawa Settan (1778–1848). The pictures and text describe the important temples and shrines, but also the famous stores, restaurants, tea-houses etc. of Edo as well as the Sumida river and its channels and surrounding landscape.

Hiroshige, in several cases, makes use of this guide for his series of colour prints (see below and within the list). His series covered the place too which the guide didn’t describe, and he drew casual views of Edo.   His series is a work that inspired a number of Western artists, including Vincent van Gogh, to experiment with imitations of Japanese methods.

The series uses a vertical format which Hiroshige pioneered in his preceding series, Famous Views of the Sixty-odd Provinces, and was a departure from the horizontal format used in his previous major print series.

Prints

Key
No.: number of the print; an alternative order for the summer prints in parentheses
Title: as it appears on the print together with English translation and Japanese reading
Depicted: major landmarks that appear in the print listed in order of increasing distance from the viewer
Remarks: some general remarks on the print
Date: publication year and month (in the pre-1873 Japanese lunisolar calendar) according to the date seal; intercalary months are preceded with "i"
Location: place, ward and coordinates of the viewpoint
Image: a picture of the print

Notes

References

 Forbes, Andrew; Henley, David (2014). 100 Famous Views of Edo. Chiang Mai: Cognoscenti Books. ASIN: B00HR3RHUY
 Melanie Trede, Hiroshige: 100 Views of Edo. Taschen, 2007. 
 Henry D. Smith, Hiroshige: One Hundred Famous Views of Edo. George Braziller, 1986.

External links

 Hiroshige: One Hundred Famous Views of Edo Brooklyn Museum Online Exhibition 
  One Hundred Famous Views of Edo (hiroshige.org.uk)
 First states of One Hundred Famous Views of Edo (earliest known prints from the series, which is different to referenced books and wikipedia)

1850s prints
Print series by Hiroshige